Silvestrini is an Italian surname that may refer to

Achille Silvestrini (born 1923), Vatican diplomat, cardinal
Gianni Silvestrini, Italian energy technology scientist 
Gilles Silvestrini (born 1961), French composer of contemporary music and oboist

Italian-language surnames
Patronymic surnames
Surnames from given names